Pitcairnia virginalis is a plant species in the genus Pitcairnia. This species is endemic to Mexico.

References

virginalis
Flora of Mexico
Plants described in 1991